Kaal is a 2005 Indian supernatural horror film written and directed by Soham Shah. It was jointly produced by Karan Johar and Shah Rukh Khan. The film stars John Abraham, Vivek Oberoi, Esha Deol, Lara Dutta and Ajay Devgn. It was released on 29 April 2005 and was an average commercial success at the box office.

The story focuses on a wildlife expert, his wife, and a group of friends who battle against a mysterious entity in the fictional Orbit National Park (alluding to the world-famous Jim Corbett National Park, Nainital, Uttarakhand) for their lives while being helped by a mysterious tour guide. The film sends out the message on protecting the precious wildlife of India.

Plot

Two British nationals are killed by a ferocious tiger in Corbett National Park in India. This incident is followed by several other tiger attacks, and many deaths result, prompting National Geographic to send a correspondent, Krish Thapar to the national park and ascertain what really happened. Krish is accompanied by his wife Riya.

A group of youngsters, consisting of Dev Malhotra, his girlfriend Ishika, his
friends Sajid and Vishal, are on a hunting trip in the hopes of sighting and shooting some big prey. Their car breaks down and Bagga, an alcoholic passerby driver, gives them a lift. Bagga's car accidentally hits Krish's car, which also breaks down and is at the middle of the road. The two groups decide to travel together in Bagga's car, leaving a mechanic to repair Krish's car.

Just a few seconds after they set off, the mechanic disappears and they believe that a wild animal just took him away and decide not to risk their lives to look for him.

Bagga finds them a guesthouse to stay which is owned by a man named DS Pandey. Pandey is a guide who agrees to lead them the next day to the core area, where tigers live, for hunting. That very night Pandey disappears and his decapitated body is found in the nearby swamp the next day. Krish starts to get suspicious about the real cause of the recent deaths in the jungle, as he is an animal expert and recognizes that Pandey's death was not the work of a tiger or any other wild animal. 

Warned by a forest officer named Bashir Khan, the group decides to leave the jungle. Before they depart, they realize that Sajid has gone missing. Dev assumes that he has gone by himself to the core area for hunting. However, the group decide to leave without Sajid. Soon they find Sajid's decapitated body by a lake. The rest are soon confronted by three tigers on the way. The group is saved by a mysterious man who introduces himself as Kaali Pratap Singh and claims to live in the jungle.

On their continued way out of the jungle, they find the road blocked by rocks due to the landslide caused by rain. Kaali shows up again and agrees to lead them out of the jungle.

Kaali appears to be very knowledgeable about the jungle and its history. Krish, who is now more curious about the mysterious deaths, asks him if he knows what's behind those deaths. Kaali responds by telling them a story about a crazy tour guide in this jungle, who used to lead tourists to the wrong places just to have them killed by wild animals. The people in the nearby villages later caught him and beat him to death but his ghost remains in the jungle and continues to kill tourists. None of them believe Kaali's story.
 
Bagga later disappears while repairing his car, rising the fear among the rest. Vishal is decapitated shortly thereafter when a window of their car flies and hus him due to the explosion.

The rest of the group members carry on and reach a deserted guesthouse in the evening, outside which there is a well. They all go to sleep after being warned by Kaali not to get close to the well. Riya wakes up thirsty in the night. She decides to get water from the well despite Kaali's warning, and is later accidentally hung by her foot in the well and dies.

The remaining group members figure out that Riya is dead and try to pull her body out from the well, while Dev suddenly notices that Kaali does not have a reflection in the well's water. Terrified by this, Dev makes an excuse to send Kaali away by asking him to gather some timbers which can be used to perform Riya's final rites. During this time, he checks all the videos which had been recorded by Vishal and notices that Kaali is not visible in any of them. Dev immediately realizes that the story Kaali told them earlier is true and that he is in fact the ghost of the tour guide mentioned in the story. Dev shows the videos to Krish and Ishika, proving to them that Kaali is a ghost and is indeed responsible for all the mysterious deaths happening in the jungle. They decide to escape the jungle once and for all. Kaali returns to the well with timbers and upon finding nobody there, he realizes that the trio have run away. 

Flashbacks reveal that the villagers did not kill Kaali but instead, took him to the core area where he was brutally beaten up and then thrown in front of a hungry tiger that mauled him to death. The story shifts back to present day where Kaali’s ghost now standing by the well, expresses his immense anger and hatred for tourists who come to the jungle to hunt wild animals and disrupt their well being without any regrets. This is the sole reason why he misleads and then kills tourists.

Krish, Dev and Ishika experience several attempts on their lives on their way out of the jungle, apparently arranged by Kaali, but finally manage to reach the road where Bagga and Khan arrive in a jeep, driving them away from the jungle.

Some time later, Krish who is now fully aware of what caused those mysterious deaths in that jungle, successfully completes his report in which, he deems the deaths as a result of tiger attacks. He reluctantly decides not to disclose the real cause of those deaths to anyone since no one will believe him but instead credits Kaali as the main contributor to the report. Meanwhile in the jungle, Kaali encounters a new group of tourists and has one of them killed by a truck.

Cast
 Ajay Devgan as Kaali Pratap Singh
 John Abraham as Krish Thapar
 Vivek Oberoi as Dev Malhotra
 Esha Deol as Riya Thapar
 Lara Dutta as Ishika Malhotra
 Shah Rukh Khan (Guest appearance in item song "Kaal Dhamaal")
 Malaika Arora (Guest appearance in item song "Kaal Dhamaal")
 Vishal Malhotra as Vishal 
 Kushal Punjabi as Sajid 
 Parmeet Sethi as Bashir Khan
 Vineet Sharma as Bagga
 Daya Shankar Pandey as DS Pandey

Production
Shah had earlier assisted Karan Johar in Kabhi Khushi Kabhie Gham... (2001). The filmmakers used 25 litres of real blood in the film. The idea of using computer-generated tigers was dropped because of the lack of its realism. The three tigers shown in Kaal were also used in the Hollywood film Gladiator (2000). Scenes involving tigers were shot in Bangkok, where they used to roam free on sets. Vivek Oberoi wanted to portray the character Kaali, but later accepted the one offered. The film was shot at the Jim Corbett National Park.

Reception
The film received mixed reviews from critics, noting it to be a different type of horror film. Planet Bollywood rated the film 5/10, stating," Soham Shah is as inept at directing performances as he is at writing an engaging screenplay or building any sort of momentum or pacing visually. Lack of strong characterization tells on the dismal level of performances from the cast. Lara Dutta cringes, cries, and yells randomly, while Esha Deol consistently carries a strange expression on her face that suggests she might have just swallowed a frog. Capable actors, Vivek Oberoi and John Abraham are sadly curtailed by their cardboard characters. Ajay Devgan tries his level best to rise above the non-existent screenplay, but the daunting task of saving the film single-handedly proves too difficult even for him."

Soundtrack
The music is composed by Salim–Sulaiman and Anand Raj Anand. The lyrics are penned by Shabbir Ahmed, Anand Raj Anand and Kailash Kher. According to the Indian trade website Box Office India, with around 16,00,000 units sold, this film's soundtrack album was the year's seventh highest-selling.

Track listing

References

External links
 

Red Chillies Entertainment films
2000s Hindi-language films
2005 films
Indian supernatural horror films
Films scored by Salim–Sulaiman
Films scored by Anand Raj Anand
Films distributed by Yash Raj Films
Films shot in Bangkok
Films shot in Uttarakhand
Films set in jungles